A chromophobe is a histological structure that does not stain readily, and thus appears relatively pale under the microscope.

Chromophobe cells are one of three cell stain types present in the anterior and intermediate lobes of the pituitary gland, the others being basophils and acidophils. One type of chromophobe cell is known as amphophils. Amphophils are epithelial cells found in the anterior and intermediate lobes of the pituitary. Together, these epithelial cells are responsible for producing the hormones of the anterior pituitary and releasing them into the bloodstream. Melanotrophs (also, Melanotropes) are another type of chromophobe which secrete melanocyte-stimulating hormone (MSH).

Clinical significance
"Chromophobe" also refers to a type of renal cell carcinoma (distinct from "clear cell"). Chromophobe renal cancer is part of a rare, genetic disorder known as Birt–Hogg–Dubé syndrome. While renal cell carcinoma is one of the most frequently diagnosed cancers, chromophobe renal cancer only accounts for five percent of renal cancer cases. Furthermore, 30% of patients with Birt–Hogg–Dubé syndrome will also develop chromophobe renal cancer. One of the only treatments for this type of cancer is to have surgery to remove any tumors that may be present.

See also 
 Melanotroph
 Chromophil
 Acidophil cell
 Basophil cell
 Oxyphil cell
 Oxyphil cell (parathyroid)
 Pituitary gland
 Neuroendocrine cell

References

Staining